Christopher Bradley Riddell (born February 1981) is a futurist and digital technology expert. He was the first Chief digital officer (CDO) for Mars, Incorporated in Australia and New Zealand, creating the corporate digital strategy behind brands such as Whiskas, Pedigree Petfoods, Wrigley Company, Starburst, Masterfoods, Snickers and Maltesers, among others.

Early life and education

Riddell was born in Manama, Bahrain to Colin and Barbara and is a dual Australian and United Kingdom Citizen. He lived his childhood in the Middle East and Europe, in countries including Qatar, Bahrain, Saudi Arabia, the United Kingdom and France.

In 1991 during the first gulf war, Riddell was temporarily moved with his family to Perth (Western Australia). One year later, he returned to the Middle East with his parents and then finally back to the United Kingdom where he completed his education.

Riddell currently lives in Melbourne, Australia.

Career

Riddell's career started in the United Kingdom in the IT and telecommunications sector. He moved in his mid twenties to Saudi Arabia and remained there for just over five years. He moved to Australia and joined MARS Australia & New Zealand to become the first Chief Digital Officer of the company. He is a senior advisor to businesses across industry verticals, with consulting expertise across the technology, transportation, manufacturing, healthcare, finance and communications sectors. He is also an active board member of the Museum of Australian Democracy at Eureka.
Riddell is a futurist and inspirational keynote speaker and has delivered strategy and keynotes for telecommunications providers, banks, financial institutions, travel providers, and businesses at the front of disruption. He is frequently called on to be a spokesperson and commentator on emerging digital trends and behaviours in the media.

See also
 List of futurologists
 Association of Professional Futurists

References

External links
 

Living people
1981 births
Futurologists
Chief digital officers